Manikeswaram is a holy village situated on the banks of the Gundlakamma river in the Prakasam district of the Indian state of Andhra Pradesh. This village is home to ancient Shiva temple. Every day hundreds of devotees flocks to Manikeswaram for offering prayers to Lord shiva. Manikeswaram is acclaimed as southern Kasi or Dakshina Kasi.

References

External links
 http://wikiedit.org/India/Manikeswaram/237772/

Villages in Prakasam district